Magnus Opare-Asamoah (born 26 November 1948) is a Ghanaian politician and a member of the fourth parliament of the fourth Republic of Ghana representing the Aburi-Nsawam constituency in the Eastern Region.

Early life and education 
Opare-Asamoah was born in Nsawam on 26 November 1948 in the Eastern Region of Ghana. He attended the Kwame Nkrumah University of Science and Technology and Obtained a Degree in Bachelor of Science after he studied civil engineering.

Politics 
Opare-Asamoah was first elected to parliament on the ticket of the New Patriotic Party during the December 2004 Ghanaian General elections. He polled 25,940 votes out of the 46,359 valid votes cast representing 56.00%. He was defeated by Mr Osei Bonsu Amoah during the Party's Parliamentary Primary in 2008.

Career 
Opare-Asamoah is an engineer. He also is the Deputy minister of Transportation and a member of the Fourth Parliament of the Fourth Republic representing the Aburi-Nsawam Constituency.

Personal life 
Opare-Asamoah is a Christian.

References 

Living people
Kwame Nkrumah University of Science and Technology alumni
Ghanaian civil engineers
New Patriotic Party politicians
People from Eastern Region (Ghana)
Ghanaian MPs 2005–2009
1948 births
Ghanaian Christians
Government ministers of Ghana